Quilmes Airport is a public use airport serving Quilmes, a southeastern suburb of Buenos Aires, Argentina.

The airport is in the shoreline green band between Quilmes and the Río de la Plata estuary. North approach and departure are over the water.

The Quilmes non-directional beacon (Ident: ILM) is located on the field.

See also

Transport in Argentina
List of airports in Argentina

References

External links 
OpenStreetMap - Quilmes Airport
OurAirports - Quilmes Airport
FallingRain - Quilmes Airport

Airports in Argentina
Buenos Aires Province